Césaire Dorlich Sydney Gandzé (born 6 March 1989) is a Congolese professional footballer who currently plays as a midfielder for AS Otohô.

Club career
Gandzé joined South African club Free State Stars in the summer 2018. He was released by the club on 10 January 2019.

International career

International goals
Scores and results list Congo's goal tally first.

Honours 
AC Léopards
Winner
 Congo Premier League (2): 2012, 2013,2014
 CAF Confederation Cup: 2012

Runner-up
 CAF Super Cup: 2013

References

External links 
 
 Césaire Gandzé at Footballdatabase

1989 births
Living people
Republic of the Congo footballers
Republic of the Congo expatriate footballers
Republic of the Congo international footballers
AC Léopards players
Free State Stars F.C. players
AS Otôho players
South African Premier Division players
2015 Africa Cup of Nations players
Association football midfielders
Republic of the Congo expatriate sportspeople in South Africa
Expatriate soccer players in South Africa
Republic of the Congo A' international footballers
2018 African Nations Championship players